Aywaille is a municipality of Wallonia located in the province of Liège, Belgium. 

On 1 January 2012, Aywaille had a total population of 11,697. The total area is 80.04 km² which gives a population density of 146 inhabitants per km². Its area consists of 45.7% of wooded and wild country, 29.9% of agricultural areas and 24.4% of built-up areas.

The inhabitants of Aywaille are called the "Aqualiens", from the Latin version of Aywaille "Aqualia loca", which means "area full of water" or "muddy land".

The municipality consists of the following districts: Aywaille, Ernonheid, Harzé, and Sougné-Remouchamps. They include many villages as Aywaille, Awan, Chambralles, Deigné, Ernonheid, Paradis, Houssonloge, Pouhon, Harzé, Havelange, Kin, Stoqueu, Martinrive, Nonceveux, Playe, Quarreux, Sedoz, Septroux, Sougné, Remouchamps, Ville-au-Bois.

Gallery

See also
 List of protected heritage sites in Aywaille

References

External links
 

 
Municipalities of Liège Province
Segni (tribe)